Athanatoi or Athanati literally mean "immortals", and may refer to:

 Immortals (Achaemenid Empire)
 Immortals (Sasanian Empire)
 Immortals (Byzantine Empire)

See also
Immortal (disambiguation)